Michael Arata (born February 23, 1966) is an American actor and film producer. He began his acting career at age four and has since appeared on stage, in feature films and television programs.

Arata was born in New Orleans, Louisiana. As an actor, he has worked with Academy Award winners Oliver Stone, Gene Hackman, Kevin Costner, Jamie Foxx, Tatum O'Neil, Kim Hunter, Billy Bob Thornton, Denzel Washington, Ellen Burstyn and Sissy Spacek, and has appeared on stage with Sir Kenneth Branagh, Ben Kingsley, and Rosemary Harris, as well as Alec Baldwin and Elizabeth Ashley in Tennessee Williams's classic The Night of the Iguana.

In addition to his film history, Arata has extensive theater experience, including acting and producing the works of Tennessee Williams, Caryl Churchill, Tony Kushner, and William Shakespeare. In 1997, American Theatre Magazine hailed Arata's performance of Stanley Kowalski in the 50th anniversary production of Tennessee Williams' classic A Streetcar Named Desire as "unhinged and electrifying", and reviewer Dalt Wonk called the performance "a Stanley for our times".

Prior to Hurricane Katrina, Arata produced Shakespeare in City Park in New Orleans, the city's only outdoor theater, as well as several productions in conjunction with the Tennessee Williams Literary Festival.

Movie producing
In 1989, Michael Arata began producing films, starting with his first short film "Looking For Someone". The film won the Grand Jury Award for Best Narrative Short at the Utah Short Film Festival. 

Since then, Arata has produced documentaries ("The People's Story" on the devastation caused by Hurricane Mitch in Central America winner of the Houston International Film Festival and Telluride Independent Film Festival; Shaolm Y'all, discussing southern Jewish culture, winner of The Sidewalk Moving Pictures Festival), and more recently several feature films, including "Deal", starring Burt Reynolds, "The Shooting Gallery", starring Freddie Prinze Jr. and Ving Rhames, "Home Front" starring Academy Award winner Tatum O'Neal, and "New Orleans Mon Amour", starring Christopher Eccleston. 

In 2006, following the devastation in New Orleans by Hurricane Katrina, Arata produced the first independent feature film ("Deal") in the city, and thereafter produced "New Orleans Mon Amour" (written and directed by Michael Almereyda), "Pool Boy" and "Autopsy" (with fellow producer Warren Zide). He recently produced the remake of the horror classic Night of the Demons as well as the action film The Courier with Jeffrey Dean Morgan, and served as Executive Producer of National Lampoon's "Dirty Movie" and  "The Legend of Awesomest Maximus".  

He got his producing start in theater, and had a successful run as chairman of Le Petit Theatre du Vieux Carre, the oldest operating theater in North America, which he returned to relevance and profitability in his three-year tenure.

Filmography

2013: Another Dirty Movie as Lawyer
2013: Remember Sunday (TV Movie) as Mr. Zed
2012: The Courier as Uniformed Cop
2011: Ricochet (TV Movie) as Defense Attorney Adams
2011: Carjacked as Trucker
2011: The Pool Boys as Doug's Dad
2011: Love, Wedding, Marriage as Cheap Bastard
2011: Blood Out as Detective
2011: Lucky as Man with Piña Colada 
2009: Night of the Demons as Louis Devereaux 
2008: Deal as Passerby 
2007: K-Ville as Lawyer / Owen's Lawyer 
2006: A Perfect Day as Concerned Man 
2006: Déjà Vu as Lawyer
2006  Life Is Not a Fairytale: The Fantasia Barrino Story (TV Movie) as Officer Kelvin 
2006  Just My Luck as Truck Driver (uncredited) 
2006  Glory Road as Sports Reporter 
2006  In as Ronnie 
2005  Shooting Gallery as Lawyer Type 
2005  Faith of My Fathers as Captain Hart 
2005  Odd Girl Out as Dave Larson 
2005  At Last as Chris 
2004  The Madam's Family: The Truth About the Canal Street Brothel (TV Movie) as Bobby 
2004  The Brooke Ellison Story (TV Movie) as Paramedic 
2004  The Dead Will Tell as Desk Sergeant 
2004  Growing Pains: Return of the Seavers as Exterminator 
2004  Torn Apart as Bingham 
2004  Ray as Cop #4 
2004  Miracle Run as Brian 
2004  Infidelity (TV Movie) as Eric 
2003  Runaway Jury'' as Raines

Hurricane Katrina
Michael Arata lives and works in New Orleans. Following Hurricane Katrina he was appointed chairman of the Bring Back New Orleans Commission Film/Entertainment subcommittee, and drafted the City of New Orleans' request for federal assistance related to the area's film and entertainment industry.
In 2002, he help draft the successful Louisiana Motion Picture Incentive Act, and was asked by Governor Murphy J. Foster, Jr. to testify before the Louisiana House and Senate in support of the legislation.

Law Career
He holds a J.D. degree from Tulane University, and regularly conducts seminars on entertainment law at Loyola University and Tulane University in New Orleans, as well as continuing legal education seminars for practicing lawyers.

Criminal History
He was convicted of conspiracy, 7 counts of wire fraud, 1 count of mail fraud, and 3 counts of making false statements to the FBI as part of a scheme to cheat Louisiana's film tax credit program.

Theatre
He was the youngest chairman of the Le Petit Theatre du Vieux Carre, a community theatre. 

He formed Art A La Carte, Louisiana's only theatre for the disabled, and one of the nation's only fully accessible creative arts programs.

References

External links

American male film actors
American male stage actors
Male actors from Louisiana
Tulane Green Wave football players
1966 births
Living people